The Bangladesh Naval Academy is situated at the mouth of the Karnaphuli River at Patenga, Chittagong District, Bangladesh. Bathed by the river Karnaphuli on the east and sheltered on the south by the Bay of Bengal, BNA stands in a panoramic natural picturesque in an isolated landscape of the country. It is surrounded by heart-snatching lush green vegetation in Patenga sea-beach, 14 km south of the city centre of the hustling port city of Chittagong. Bangladesh Naval Academy is well connected by rail, road and air from Dhaka.

History 

Bangladesh Naval Academy is reputed military academy for naval training in South East Asia. It was established in 1976 at the premises of the Mercantile Marine Academy at Juludia, Chittagong, later shifted to BNS Issa Khan in Chittagong to train the cadets of the Bangladesh Navy. The academy shifted to its present location in 1988. Yuri V Redkin, a Soviet Union navy sailor who died clearing mines left from the Bangladesh Liberation War in Chittagong port, is buried here. The military academy was opened by the initiative of the then Prime Minister Sheikh Mujibur Rahman. The academy was officially commissioned on 2 June 1988 and started functioning independently in the picturesque site of Patenga just at the river mouth of Karnaphuli. Inspired by its motto 'Fight in the way of Allah' Bangladesh Naval Academy has been making commendable contributions' in the national life of Bangladesh by training its own and overseas naval officers during the last 3 decades. In July 1998, the first batch of overseas cadets joined Bangladesh Naval Academy. Till 2018, more than 100 foreign cadets from friendly countries like Palestine, Maldives and Qatar got commission from this academy. BNA is the pioneer institution in inducting female cadets in the armed forces. In January 2000, the first batch of 16 female cadets joined BNA for cadet training. So far, more than 110 female officers have been commissioned from this academy. In recognition of outstanding achievements over the past decades, BNA has been awarded with the National Standard on 28 Dec 2003 by the Prime Minister.

Honour code
A UT officer shall lead a life of honour and dignity. He or she shall not lie, steal or cheat, nor he or she should tolerate any of those acts.

Training
All cadets of the Bangladesh Navy undergo 10 weeks of joint services training in Bangladesh Military Academy with the Army and Air Force cadets. In the Bangladesh Naval Academy, they continue for another 15 months training till they become Midshipmen. The Midshipmen are sent to ships for 6 months of sea training. After sea training i.e. after 3 years of training they are commissioned in the Bangladesh Navy in the rank of Sub Lieutenant. Officers are also awarded the Bachelor of Science degree as they graduate from the academy with the affiliation of Bangladesh University of Professionals (Bangladesh). In 2014 the academy has introduced 4 years BSc(Hons) in Maritime Science and BBA in Logistics and Management under Bangladesh University of Professionals.

Many foreign cadets like Palestinians, Sri Lankan, Maldivian and Qatari etc. are trained in BNA. There are four wings in the academy namely- professional wing, academic wing, training, and administrative wing. Junior Staff Course (JSC) is also conducted at BNA under JSC Wing.

Presently, Commodore A K M Afzal Hossain, (C), OSP, afwc, psc, BN is the Commandant of The Bangladesh Naval Academy.

Training course
The training courses run at BNA are as follow:
 Long Course – 3 years.
 Direct Entry Officer Course – 24 weeks.
 Junior Staff Course - 12 weeks
 Branch Rank Common Course

Training criteria
One of the premiere training institutes of Bangladesh, BNA deals with the immense task of fulfilling national policy and committed for developing commissioned officers to lead the future Bangladesh Navy. Primarily, BNA training has four dimensions:
 Leadership: To impart all the qualities to be a good leader .
 Physical Training: To attain the military standard of physical fitness.
 Naval Training: It facilities naval training which includes Seamanship Model Room, Chart Room, Sailing and Pulling, NBCD simulator, Planetarium for Astro Navigation etc.
 Academics: Academic training facilities include physics lab, Language lab, Computer lab, Library etc. BNA also conducts basic Computer Course, Branch Rank Common Course, Language Course and Junior Staff Course for BN and overseas officers.

Club activities and facilities
Sailing and Pulling facilities
To be habituated with the naval life it provides  sailing and pulling facilities

Computer Club
This club works on enhancing cadets about computer knowledge. Make them confident about handling of computer.

Language Club
This club works on increasing the efficiency of cadets on different languages for speaking and writing.

Recreation
Adequate sports and other recreational facilities including golf are available.

Medical facilities
First aid centre with qualified doctors is available within the campus. Combined Military Hospital, BNS PATENGA is only a few kilometers from the academy.

Accommodation
Well-furnished gun room for cadets and under training officers.

Division
The academy divided into three division based on the parts of warship:

  Main Top 
  Quarter Deck 
  Fox'l

See also
 Bangladesh Marine Academy
 Bangladesh Marine Fisheries Academy
 Bangladesh Military Academy
 Bangladesh Air Force Academy

References

External links
 BNA website

Naval academies
Bangladesh Navy
Bangladesh University of Professionals
Bangladesh Armed Forces education and training establishments
1976 establishments in Bangladesh